Rehaan Roy is an Indian actor and model who has performed many roles in various Hindi and Bengali television shows. He is known for the lead role of Ishaan in Ogo Bodhu Sundori, Rishi in Sajda Tere Pyaar Mein, Ajgaar in Naagarjuna – Ek Yoddha, Sahil in Ek Vivah Aisa Bhi and Vikram Bhatt's web series Tantra. He also appeared on &TV's daily soap Agniphera as Abhimanyu. Currently, he is playing the role of Parv Singh in Guddan Tumse Na Ho Payega and Khalid Mirza in Bahu Begum.

Filmography

Film
2010 Amanush as Aditya

Television

Web series
2017–2018 Vikram Bhatt's Tantra

References

External links

21st-century Indian male actors
Indian male models
Indian male television actors
Male actors in Hindi television
Male actors from Kolkata
Living people
1988 births